Snyman Prinsloo (born 22 May 1984) is a South African former athlete.

A sprinter, Prinsloo had personal bests of 10.32 seconds for the 100 metres and 20.70 seconds for the 200 metres. He was a member of South Africa's silver medal-winning 4 × 100 metres team at the 2006 Commonwealth Games in Melbourne and also ran in the relay at 2007 World Championships. At the 2007 All-Africa Games in Algiers, Prinsloo came fifth in the individual 100 metres final with a time of 10.39 seconds, putting him .02 seconds off the podium.

Prinsloo married heptathlete Mariska Meintjies.

References

External links
Snyman Prinsloo at World Athletics

1984 births
Living people
South African male sprinters
Commonwealth Games silver medallists for South Africa
Commonwealth Games medallists in athletics
Medallists at the 2006 Commonwealth Games
Athletes (track and field) at the 2006 Commonwealth Games
Universiade silver medalists in athletics (track and field)
Universiade silver medalists for South Africa
Medalists at the 2007 Summer Universiade
Competitors at the 2005 Summer Universiade
World Athletics Championships athletes for South Africa
Athletes (track and field) at the 2007 All-Africa Games
African Games competitors for South Africa